Captain Fingers is the third studio album by guitarist Lee Ritenour, released in 1977 by Epic Records.

Track listing

Personnel

Lee Ritenour – guitar, guitar synthesizer
Ernie Watts – saxophone
Dave Grusin – synthesizer (tracks 1, 3), Minimoog, clavinet, electric piano (tracks 2, 3, 7), conducting (tracks 3, 7), arrangement (tracks 3, 7)
David Foster – electric piano (tracks 5, 6)
Dawilli Gonga – electric piano (tracks 1, 4)
Patrice Rushen – electric piano (track 1)
Ian Underwood – synthesizer (tracks 1, 2, 4), programming (track 3), piano
Jay Graydon – guitar (track 1)
Ray Parker Jr. – guitar (tracks 5, 6)
Dennis Budimir – guitar (track 7)
Mitch Holder – guitar (track 6)
Ray Cramer – cello
Michel Colombier – strings arrangement (track 2)
Alphonso Johnson – bass (tracks 1, 4)
Anthony Jackson – bass (tracks 1–3)
Bill Dickinson – bass (track 7)
Charles Meeks – bass (track 6)
Mike Porcaro – bass (track 5)
Jeff Porcaro – drums (tracks 5, 6)
Harvey Mason – drums (except tracks 5, 6), percussion (tracks 2, 3, 6, 7)
Steve Foreman – percussion (tracks 2, 5, 7)
Steve Mason – percussion (tracks 4, 6)
Victor Feldman – congas
Bill Champlin – vocals

Production
 Jerry Schoenbaum – executive producer
 Lee Ritenour – producer
 Skip Drinkwater – producer
 Tommy Vicari – engineering, remixing
 Linda Tyler – engineering
 Bernie Grundman – mastering
 Joe Gastwirt – remastering
 Don Murray – remixing
 John Mills – remixing

Charts

References

Lee Ritenour albums
1977 albums
Epic Records albums